Robert Stewart Munn (August 23, 1829 – December 17, 1894) was a Scottish-born merchant and politician in Newfoundland. He represented Harbour Grace in the Newfoundland House of Assembly as a Reform Party member from 1889 until his death in 1894.

The son of Dugald Munn, a banker, and Elizabeth Stewart, he was born in Bute and came to Newfoundland in 1851 to join the firm of Punton and Munn, which was then owned by his uncle John Munn. In 1862, Munn became manager of the firm's operation in Harbour Grace. In the same year, he married Elizabeth Munden. In 1872, Munn and his cousin William Punton Munn became partners in the business, now known as John Munn and Company. When William went to England due to poor health in 1881, Munn became the sole manager.

He was elected to the Newfoundland assembly in 1889 and reelected in 1893.

A decline in the price of fish had resulted in accumulating debt for John Munn and Company during the 1890s. The Union Bank in St. John's, which held most of that debt, failed in 1894.

Munn died of pleurisy in Harbour Grace at the age of 65. His estate was declared insolvent and the company went bankrupt soon afterwards.

References

External links 
 

Members of the Newfoundland and Labrador House of Assembly
1829 births
1894 deaths
Newfoundland Colony people
Scottish emigrants to pre-Confederation Newfoundland
Pre-Confederation Canadian businesspeople
People from the Isle of Bute
Deaths from pleurisy